Elections to Banbridge District Council were held on 20 May 1981 on the same day as the other Northern Irish local government elections. The election used two district electoral areas to elect a total of 15 councillors.

Election results

Note: "Votes" are the first preference votes.

Districts summary

|- class="unsortable" align="centre"
!rowspan=2 align="left"|Ward
! % 
!Cllrs
! % 
!Cllrs
! %
!Cllrs
! %
!Cllrs
!rowspan=2|TotalCllrs
|- class="unsortable" align="center"
!colspan=2 bgcolor="" | UUP
!colspan=2 bgcolor="" | DUP
!colspan=2 bgcolor="" | SDLP
!colspan=2 bgcolor="white"| Others
|-
|align="left"|Area A
|bgcolor="40BFF5"|34.7
|bgcolor="40BFF5"|3
|25.3
|2
|13.9
|1
|26.1
|1
|7
|-
|align="left"|Area B
|bgcolor="40BFF5"|50.4
|bgcolor="40BFF5"|5
|27.9
|2
|16.2
|1
|5.5
|0
|8
|- class="unsortable" class="sortbottom" style="background:#C9C9C9"
|align="left"| Total
|42.1
|8
|26.5
|4
|14.9
|2
|16.5
|1
|15
|-
|}

Districts results

Area A

1977: 3 x UUP, 1 x DUP, 1 x SDLP, 1 x Independent Nationalist, 1 x Independent Unionist
1981: 3 x UUP, 2 x DUP, 1 x SDLP, 1 x Independent Nationalist
1977-1981 Change: DUP gain from Independent Unionist

Area B

1977: 5 x UUP, 2 x DUP, 1 x SDLP
1981: 5 x UUP, 2 x DUP, 1 x SDLP
1977-1981 Change: No change

References

Banbridge District Council elections
Banbridge